Lusi Faiva (born in Te Whanganui-a-Tara/Wellington) is a New Zealand-Sāmoan stage performer and dancer and a founding member of Touch Compass. She was recognised for her work with a 2020 Pacific Toa Artist Award at the Arts Pasifika Awards and in 2021 received an Artistic Achievement Award from Te Putanga Toi Arts Access Awards.

Early life 
Born with cerebral palsy, Faiva was taken from her birth parents and placed into an institution by the state. Ted and Peg Jones fostered her at the age of two, and she was reunited with her birth mother at the age of seven, and discovered her Sāmoan (Patamea, Savai'i) heritage. She grew up in Levin, Lower Hutt and Petone.

Career 
Faiva is described as a role model for 'disabled and non-disabled artists and audiences'. She has been a performer for the last 30 years, and considers her career to be her greatest achievement. Faiva is a founding member of Aotearoa's Touch Compass, a professional performance company that is disability-led, producing performance works and arts activations. She has performed for the company in all its major shows in Aotearoa and Australia since 1997 and sits on the Artistic Direction Panel.“As a performer with a disability, I have had to overcome barriers, with people saying that I can’t talk or dance. But it seems that I have proved them wrong. I believe it is possible for anyone who has a disability to achieve their dreams in this able-bodied world” (Faiva)One of her first shows Lusi’s Eden (2001), is an autobiographical performance based on her early childhood years spent living in institutions, which she reprised in 2002 and 2007. Described by Auckland Art Festival's director Shona McCullagh as "one of the most impactful works I have ever seen. This was truly ground-breaking work.”

Mr and Mrs Jones (2014), is a short film about her foster parents who taught her to read and write, enabling her to communicate with others.

Faiva performed in Wellington’s CubaDupa festival in 2021, collaborating with the theatre company Everybody Cool Lives Here and Tupe Lualua, creating a work called Taupou. Creating Taupou was a journey for Faiva about reconnection and acceptance through her culture and community, as a Sāmoan. Faiva intends to turn Taupou into a full-length show to tour around the country in the near future.

Performances and Films 
 2021 Taupou, Everybody Cool Lives Here, Cubadupa
 2021 Being Me:Lusi, Attitude Pictures
 2019 Masina Returning Home, Touch Compass, Frozen Light production
 2019 Becoming Masina, short documentary, director Veronica Maitre, Doc Edge Festival
 2014 Me and Mrs Jones, short film, DanceBox
 2005-2006 Old Yella, Tempo
 2004 Absurd Beauties, Splash Dance Company
 2001 Lusi's Eden
 1997 - 2007 Toured Aotearoa NZ and Australia for the company Touch Compass's major shows

Awards 
 2021 Arts Access PAK’nSAVE Artistic Achievement Award,Te Putanga Toi Arts Access Awards
 2020 Spirit of Attitude award, The Attitude Awards, Creating Achievements of the Disability Community
 2020 Pacific Toa Artist Award, Creative New Zealand
 2019 Highly Commended PAK’n’SAVE Artistic Achievement Award, Te Putanga Toi Arts Access Awards

See also
 List of dancers

References

External reference 
Video about Lusi Faiva on You Tube
Physically integrated dance
Dance in New Zealand
Samoan New Zealander
Year of birth missing (living people)
Living people